The Special Forces Police Brigade "Fulger" is a specialized police unit of the General Police Inspectorate.

It is considered to be one of the most combat-ready units in Moldova. It is based in Chișinău. It is heavily involved in the fight against crime and terrorism as well as hostage rescue missions.

History
It was created by decree of the Government of Moldova on the basis of the Kishinev OPON of the Moldavian Soviet Socialist Republic on 5 December 1991. From 1991 to 1992, the unit took an active part in the Transnistrian conflict, for which it was awarded a battle banner in 1992.

Awards 

 Order of Ștefan cel Mare (awarded on 5 December 2011)

References 

Law enforcement in Moldova
Non-military counterterrorist organizations
Special forces of Moldova
Non-military counterinsurgency organizations